Sturmgeschütz Brigade 341 was a German Army unit of World War II that was equipped with Sturmgeschütz (usually abbreviated as StuG) assault guns. It was formed in 1943 and saw combat on the Western Front in France and Germany.

History

The unit was established in December 1943 as Sturmgeschütz Abteilung 341 and was re-designated StuG Brigade 341 during February 1944. Located near Narbonne in the south of France, it was equipped with 19 StuG IIIs and 9 Sturmhaubitze 42s on 1 June 1944; this was less than the authorised strength of 45 armoured vehicles. It reached its full strength of 33 StuG IIIs and 12 Sturmhaubitze 42s by 1 July.

StuG Brigade 341 began moving towards Normandy on 25 July. It suffered heavy casualties during the unsuccessful German attempts to contain the American Operation Cobra breakout near Avranches during late July and early August, with two of its three batteries being almost destroyed. Elements of the brigade were involved in the Battle of Saint-Malo during August, during which the unit suffered further casualties. Replacements were received, and on 1 October the brigade had 23 vehicles (of which 13 were in repair) and almost its full complement of personnel. In November StuG Brigade 341 was involved in fighting with US Army forces on the Siegfried Line.

References
References

Works consulted

Military units and formations established in 1943
Military units and formations disestablished in 1945
Armoured brigades of the German Army in World War II